Perryvale is a hamlet in northern Alberta, Canada within Athabasca County It is  east of Highway 2,  north of Edmonton.

Demographics 

See also 
List of communities in Alberta
List of designated places in Alberta
List of hamlets in Alberta

References 

Athabasca County
Hamlets in Alberta
Designated places in Alberta